BMP-2-inducible protein kinase is an enzyme in humans encoded by the BMP2K gene.

Function 

This gene is the human homolog of mouse BMP-2-inducible kinase. Bone morphogenic proteins (BMPs) play a key role in skeletal development and patterning. Expression of the mouse gene is increased during BMP-2 induced differentiation and the gene product is a putative serine/threonine protein kinase containing a nuclear localization signal. Therefore, the protein encoded by this human homolog is thought to be a protein kinase with a putative regulatory role in attenuating the program of osteoblast differentiation. Two transcript variants encoding different isoforms have been found for this gene.

References

External links

Further reading